The Gitschen (2,513 m) is a mountain of the Urner Alps, overlooking Lake Lucerne in the canton of Uri. It lies on the range north of the Surenen Pass, culminating at the Brunnistock.

References

External links

 Gitschen on Hikr

Mountains of Switzerland
Mountains of the Alps
Mountains of the canton of Uri